The Moluccan starling (Aplonis mysolensis) is a species of starling in the family Sturnidae. It is endemic to Indonesia.

Its natural habitats are subtropical or tropical moist lowland forests and subtropical or tropical mangrove forests.

References

Moluccan starling
Moluccan starling
Birds of the Maluku Islands
Moluccan starling
Moluccan starling
Taxonomy articles created by Polbot